The mixed Nacra 15 competition at the 2018 Summer Youth Olympics in Buenos Aires took place between 8–13 October at Club Nautico San Isidro. Thirteen races were held.

Schedule

Results

References 

 

Nacra 15